Arturo Zamora Jiménez (born March 30, 1956 in Guadalajara, Jalisco) is a Mexican lawyer and politician affiliated with the Institutional Revolutionary Party (PRI). He is  running as the PRI candidate to the governorship of Jalisco.

Zamora studied law at the Universidad de Guadalajara (UdeG). He has worked as lawyer and notary public in his native Jalisco.  He is a divorced father of three.

Political career
In 1982 Zamora joined the PRI; since then he has been an active member of that party.  In 2003 he was elected municipal president of Zapopan.

References

See also
2006 Jalisco state election

1956 births
People from Guadalajara, Jalisco
Living people
20th-century Mexican lawyers
Municipal presidents in Jalisco
Institutional Revolutionary Party politicians
21st-century Mexican politicians
University of Guadalajara alumni
Members of the Senate of the Republic (Mexico) for Jalisco